Kriyananda (born James Donald Walters; May 19, 1926 – April 21, 2013) was an American Hindu religious leader, yoga guru, musician, and an author. He was a direct disciple of Paramahansa Yogananda, and founder of the spiritual movement named "Ananda". He authored over 150 books, and composed about 400 piece of music. In 1998, he was found guilty of "constructive fraud", with a finding of "malice" and "fraudulent conduct" in a sexual harassment lawsuit. 

He was one of many direct disciples of the yogi, Paramahansa Yogananda. After Yogananda's death, Walters was given final vows of sannyas and ordained as a Brother of the SRF Order, along with Sarolananda, Bimalananda and Bhaktananda, in 1955 by then SRF President Daya Mata and was given the name Kriyananda.  In 1960, upon the passing of M.W. Lewis, the SRF Board of Directors elected Kriyananda to the Board of Directors and eventually to the position of Vice President. In 1962, the SRF Board of Directors voted unanimously to expel him from SRF and requested his resignation.  

Kriyananda founded Ananda, a worldwide movement of religious and communal organizations based on Yogananda's World Brotherhood Colonies ideal. Also, he established his own new Swami order in 2009: the Nayaswami Order different from Yogananda's lineage in the Giri branch of the Swami Order of Shankara. Kriyananda authored about 150 published books/booklets and composed about 400 pieces of music, which altogether have sold over three million copies. A few of the books have been published in 28 languages.  He lectured in different countries throughout the world. In addition to English, he spoke Italian, Romanian, Greek, French, Spanish, German, Hindi, Bengali, and Indonesian. 

For twelve years from 1990-2002 Self-Realization Fellowship, the teachings of Paramahansa Yogananda, filed suit against James Donald Walters (a.k.a. Kriyananda) and Walters' newly named Church of Self-Realization regarding specific writings, photographs and recordings of Paramahansa Yogananda. According to Doug Mattson of the Union, SRF asserted Yogananda made it clear that he wanted SRF, Yogananda’s organization, to maintain the copyrights to his works and to publish them. Doug Mattson wrote that in the end, "the jurors ultimately agreed with Self-Realization Fellowship's argument that Yogananda had repeatedly made his intentions clear before dying - he wanted the Fellowship to maintain copyrights to his works."

According to Vicky Anning of Palo Alto Weekly, in 1997-98 Kriyananda aka Donald Walters was found guilty in a court of law, "fraudulently representing himself as a celibate religious leader or swami although he had sex with several of his devotees during 30 years at the helm of Ananda." Several women came forward during the civil trial to testify that Walters had sexually exploited them.

Biography

Early life
J. Donald Walters was born on May 19, 1926, in Teleajen, Romania to American parents, Ray P. and Gertrude G. Walters. His father was an oil geologist with the Esso Corporation (since renamed Exxon in the United States) who was then assigned to the Romanian oilfields. He received an international education in Romania, Switzerland, England, and the United States. He attended Haverford College and Brown University, leaving the latter with only a semester left before graduation to dedicate his life to searching for God.

Time with Yogananda
In September 1948, in New York, Walters read Yogananda's Autobiography of a Yogi, a book he says transformed his life. By September 12, Walters had decided to leave his old life behind, became a vegetarian, and soon afterwards traveled cross-country by bus to southern California to become one of Yogananda's disciples. In Hollywood, California, Walters first met Yogananda at the Self-Realization Fellowship temple there and was accepted as a disciple.
As recounted in his autobiography, The New Path, Walters, twenty-two years old at this point, took up residence with other monks at SRF's mother center headquarters located on top of Mount Washington, Los Angeles. A year later, Yogananda had put Walters in charge of the monks there, asked him to write articles for the SRF magazine, had him lecture at various SRF centers, ordained him a minister, and appointed him to initiate students into Kriya Yoga. In their three and one half years (9/1948–3/1952) together, Walters took notes of his conversations with his master, publishing them in his 2003 The Essence of Self-Realization and his 2004 Conversations with Yogananda.

After Yogananda
On March 7, 1952, Paramahansa Yogananda was a speaker at a banquet for the visiting Indian Ambassador to the U.S., Binay Ranjan Sen, and his wife at the Biltmore Hotel in downtown Los Angeles. While giving his speech, Yogananda suddenly dropped to the floor and died. Walters was present in the hall, and this was a pivotal moment for the young monk.

In 1953, the SRF published Walter's book, Stories of Mukunda, and in 1960 an LP album with him singing Yogananda's Cosmic Chants, entitled Music for Meditation. In 1955, Walters was given his final vows of sannyas into the order of Shankaracharya swamis, by Daya Mata, SRF president from 1955 until her death in 2010, and took the monastic name of "Kriyananda". Yogananda stated in his Autobiography of a Yogi regarding this order:
Every swami belongs to the ancient monastic order which was organized in its present form by Shankara. Because it is a formal order, with an unbroken line of saintly representatives serving as active leaders, no man can give himself the title of swami. He rightfully receives it only from another swami; all monks thus trace their spiritual lineage to one common guru, Lord Shankara. By vows of poverty, chastity, and obedience to the spiritual teacher, many Catholic Christian monastic orders resemble the Order of Swamis.

He was made a minister of Yogananda's Hollywood temple. In 1958, when Daya Mata, then President of SRF, traveled to India with Ananda Mata and another nun, he came along as well. In 1960, upon the death of Board member and Vice President of SRF, M.W. Lewis, the SRF Board of Directors, who were direct disciples appointed to the board by Yogananda, elected Kriyananda as a member and Vice President of the Board. He served in that capacity until dismissed in 1962.

Dismissal
Kriyananda remained in India, serving the SRF until 1962, when the SRF's board of directors voted unanimously to request his resignation.  According to Phillip Goldberg, SRF won't say exactly why except that he was self-serving. Kriyananda felt that being dismissed from SRF was unjust.

Outward accomplishments
Kriyananda established Ananda Village as a World Brotherhood Colony in 1968 on 40 acres (160,000 m2) of land near Nevada City, California – his portion of a 160-acre (0.6 km2) parcel acquired with Richard Baker, Gary Snyder, and Allen Ginsberg. The village was actually founded with the signing of the first purchase agreement of a larger parcel of land on July 4, 1969. According to Kriyananda, these communities provide a supportive environment of “simple living and high thinking” where 1,000 full-time residents live, work, and worship together. The establishment of World Brotherhood Colonies was one of Yogananda's central "Aims and Ideals" published in his Autobiography of a Yogi until 1958.

Kriyananda founded various retreat centers: The Expanding Light Yoga and Meditation Retreat and nearby Ananda Meditation Retreat, both located near Nevada City, California, U.S.A.; Ananda Associazione near Assisi, Italy; and Ananda Gurgaon, India.

There are over 125 Ananda Meditation groups in 19 countries, all of which were inspired in one way or another by Kriyananda. 

Kriyananda stated that at Yogananda's request he devoted his life to teaching. Over the course of sixty years, he lectured on four continents in five languages. He gave thousands of lectures and continued lecturing in Asia, Europe, and America until his death.

Kriyananda met a number of well-known spiritual teachers: Anandamayi Ma; Sivananda Saraswati and his disciples Chidananda and Satchidananda; Muktananda; Satya Sai Baba; Neem Karoli Baba; the 14th Dalai Lama; A. C. Bhaktivedanta Prabhupada; Ravi Shankar; Vicka Ivankovic, visionary of Medjugorje; and a few others.

In the early 1960s, one of Kriyananda's inter-religious projects near New Delhi, India, received personal support from India's Prime Minister, Jawaharlal Nehru. He also had personal contact with Indira Gandhi; with India's Vice President Radhakrishnan; and, in 2006, with India's President, Abdul Kalam.

On 8th March 1989, Kriyananda's World Brotherhood Choir from California performed at the Vatican for Pope John Paul II during his public audience with 10,000 people in attendance.

In following his guru's guidance that his task would be "writing, editing, and lecturing", Kriyananda wrote about 150 books, each of which he stated was intended to help individuals expand their awareness. By the application of Yogananda's teachings, they expand on such varied topics as marriage, education, leadership and success, spiritual communities, yoga, self-healing, art, architecture, astrology, and philosophy, as well as Yogananda's teachings on the Bible, the Bhagavad Gita, the Rubaiyat of Omar Khayyam, and other scriptures.

One of Kriyananda's books is The Path (revised as The New Path in 2009), which among other things contains details of the three and a half years he spent as Yogananda's direct disciple in Los Angeles.

Kriyananda started Crystal Clarity Publishers and the East-West bookshops in Sacramento and Mountain View, California, and Seattle, Washington.

Kriyananda's plays include The Peace Treaty and The Jewel in the Lotus. He wrote his first play at age fifteen and worked and studied with the Dock Street Theater in Charleston, South Carolina, in his early 20s. Rome's famous Teatro Valle (its oldest still-active theater, built in 1726) hosted The Peace Treaty in June 2009.

Kriyananda won poetry and essay contest prizes at Haverford College and also studied under the poet W.H. Auden at Bryn Mawr College.

In 1973, Kriyananda developed a system for educating children called Education for Life. Education for Life schools state that they offer character development, strong academics, and development of moral strength. The school curriculum is ecumenical; students from all religious backgrounds may attend. There are schools in Seattle, Washington; Portland, Oregon; and Palo Alto and Nevada City, California (all U.S.A.); in Italy near Assisi; and one was recently (2009) started in Gurgaon, India. Other schools are adopting the curriculum and ideals of Education for Life. Kriyananda's educational ideas also inspired Ananda College, a yoga university as envisioned by Paramahansa Yogānanda, located near Nevada City, California.

Kriyananda created Ananda Yoga. Yogananda had asked him often to perform the asanas for visiting guests, in his presence. This inspired him to create Ananda Yoga. It is designed to uplift consciousness, and to prepare the student for meditation. Its distinguishing features are the affirmations associated with postures.

Kriyananda took over 15,000 photographs, many of which he said captured the consciousness of human beings behind the image. His photos have been used on inspirational posters, on album covers, for slideshows, in film productions, and in books.
Kriyananda created several paintings, which have been used on book covers and on posters.

He also produced films, as follows:
  Saint Francis of Assisi (narration,  music, photography)
  Mediterranean Magic (narration,  music, photography)
  The Land of Mystery (narration,  music, photography)
  The Autobiography of a Yogi (narration,  music, photography)
  Christ Lives! (narration,  music, photography)
  Different Worlds (narration,  music, photography)

Volunteer work
  1948–2013: As a renunciate  or as a householder, Kriyananda dedicated his life in service to others. Copyrights to his books and music were placed in a trust. Royalties were directed toward the work of sharing Kriyananda’s teachings with the public. For many years in his later life, he received no salary or stipend, and depended on donations for all his needs, including food, housing, and medical care.
  1997: After the destructive Umbria and Marche earthquake that damaged large areas around Assisi, Italy, including the Basilica of St. Francis, Kriyananda raised funds to help rebuild homes in the area, in a campaign called “Hope and Homes for Italy”. He encouraged the use of wood instead of stone building materials, to minimize future earthquake fatalities.

Legal cases

Self-Realization Fellowship Church vs Ananda Church of Self-Realization & J. Donald Walters litigation
Self-Realization Fellowship filed suit against James Donald Walters (a.k.a. Kriyananda) and Walters' (then-called) Church of Self-Realization regarding the changing of the name to the Church of Self-Realization and on issues regarding specific writings, photographs and recordings of Paramahansa Yogananda. The litigation lasted for around twelve years (1990–2002). SRF asserted Yogananda wanted SRF to maintain the copyrights to his works and to publish them. 

At the jury trial in 2002, SRF prevailed on its assertion that Yogananda repeatedly stated his intentions for SRF to maintain copyrights to his works and to publish them. 

In 2002, the long litigation was completed with a jury verdict. As reported in The Union, a newspaper located in Grass Valley, California, on October 30, 2002:

 Yogananda had incorporated the Self-Realization Fellowship as a nonprofit organization and reassigned all of his property including Mt Washington to the corporation, thereby protecting his assets.

Anne-Marie Bertolucci vs J Donald Walters & Ananda litigation
In 1994, the attorney Ford Greene, the lawyer for Anne-Marie Bertolucci, a former resident of Ananda, filed suit against Ananda, Ananda minister Danny Levin, and J. Donald Walters (Kriyananda). Journalist Vicky Anning wrote that "Walters was sued for sexual harassment and fraud by former Ananda member Anne-Marie Bertolucci, whose lawyers claimed Walters fraudulently used his title of swami, implying he was celibate."

At the end of trial in 1998 the jury found the church (Ananda) and Kriyananda guilty. During the trial, six women testified under oath that Kriyananda had taken sexual advantage of them when they were impressionable twentysomethings in search of spiritual advancement. Walters blamed the women who accused him of sexual abuse, saying they thrust their company on him and interrupted his meditations by taking advantage of his sexual weaknesses. Court depositions came from many different women from different areas over a twenty-year period whose only point of contact had been the Ananda church. The church was found liable for "negligent supervision" of Kriyananda, with a finding of "malice and fraud" on the part of the church.

Kriyananda was judged to have misrepresented himself as a monk and to have caused emotional trauma, and was ordered to pay $685,000 in compensatory damages, and another $1 million in punitive damages. The jury also found that Levin had made "unwelcome sexual advances". The punitive damages were reduced by $400,000 on appeal.  The Ananda Church responded to the million-plus-dollar judgment by filing for protection under Chapter 11 of the federal bankruptcy code. That allowed Ananda to settle the lawsuit by paying $1.8 million to Bertolucci and her attorneys. Ananda hired a private investigator who was caught rummaging in the trash of opposing counsel.  The judge's sanctions of Ananda included disallowing the questioning of the many women alleging sexual misconduct against Kriyananda.

Ananda Assisi vs Italian authorities
In March 2004, Italian authorities raided the Ananda colony in Assisi, responding to allegations of a former resident who accused Ananda Assisi of fraud, usury and labor law violations. Nine residents were detained for questioning. They also had a warrant for Kriyananda's detention, but he was in India. A seven-year-long investigation followed. In March 2009, the judge ruled that the case was "non luogo a procedere perché il fatto non sussiste" (not to be continued as the matter is without substance).

Recent years
Kriyananda married in 1981, and publicly renounced his monastic vows in the Shankaracharya order on the occasion of his second marriage in 1985 and returned to using his birth name, James Donald Walters. He was later divorced. In 1995, on his own, he resumed his monastic name and vows.

From 1996, as Kriyananda, he lived and taught for seven years at the Ananda Italy center, near Assisi.

In 2003, he moved to India, where he began an Ananda center in Gurgaon, near Delhi. For five years (until May 1, 2009) he appeared on Sadhna TV and Aastha TV, television channels that were broadcast throughout India, Asia, Europe, and the United States. Since his 2003 move to India, Ananda teachers have been giving classes on meditation and Kriyā Yoga in many major Indian cities. In 2009, at age 83, he moved to Pune to start a new community.

In 2009, he established a new swami order, different from Yogananda's lineage in the Giri branch of the Swami Order of Shankara. According to Kriyananda, he believed that in this new age (Dvapara Yuga) not all old patterns remained valid, some reformation was necessary. Some of the features of the newly formed Nayaswami order are: (1) Nayaswamis can be single or married. (2) They can be freely creative, if the purpose is to serve others. (3) A new Nayaswami is named not by one Nayaswami (which had been the tradition), but by three. (4) A Nayaswami of this new order is called "Nayaswami", with "naya" meaning "new". Hence, he initiated himself and gave himself the title Nayaswami.

On April 21, 2013, he died in his home in Assisi. His remains were brought back to Ananda Village in May 2013.

References

External links

Ananda India

1926 births
2013 deaths
20th-century Hindu religious leaders
21st-century Hindu religious leaders
American Hindus
American people convicted of fraud
American religious leaders
American spiritual teachers
Devotees of Paramahansa Yogananda
Founders of new religious movements
Hindu new religious movements
Hindu religious leaders convicted of crimes
Kriya yogis
People from Prahova County
Sexual harassment